Stay with Me is an album by American singer–songwriter Regina Belle. Released on August 22, 1989, by Columbia Records, the album is Belle's sophomore release; two years after her debut album, All by Myself. The album peaked at number 63 on the US Billboard 200 and number one on the Top R&B/Hip-Hop Albums chart. It includes the hit singles "All I Want Is Forever" (featuring James "J.T." Taylor), "Baby Come to Me" (an R&B No. 1), "Make It Like It Was" (another R&B No. 1) and "What Goes Around". "Good Lovin'" was released as a single in the UK, where it reached number 73 in the UK Singles Chart. The album was certified Gold by the RIAA on January 22, 1990.

Track listing

Charts

Weekly charts

Year-end charts

Certifications

References

External links
 Discogs

See also
List of number-one R&B albums of 1989 (U.S.)

1989 albums
Regina Belle albums
Albums produced by Narada Michael Walden
Albums produced by Walter Afanasieff
Columbia Records albums